Primitivo "Tibo" Medrana Mijares (November 17, 1931 – disappeared 1977) was a Filipino journalist, author, war hero, and former press censor and propagandist. He was a reporter of the Philippines Daily Express, a newspaper in circulation during the regime of former Philippine President Ferdinand Marcos.

On October 23, 1974, Mijares fled the Philippines for the United States, later issuing a defection statement in the United States on February 5, 1975. He would then testify about tortures and corruption in the Marcos administration. Mijares was last seen in January 1977, boarding a flight from Guam to the Philippines with General Fabian Ver and a nephew of Querube Makalintal. He has been missing since.

Early life and education 
In his early years, Mijares lived in Santo Tomas, Batangas. He was orphaned at the age of 12 after his mother Perla Medrana and father Jose Mijares were killed by Japanese soldiers during World War II. When Japanese soldiers attempted to commandeer the town's horses, Mijares deceived the soldiers by pretending to give orders to his horse, but was actually telling the townsfolk to hide their horses in a local dialect. Following the war, he was separated from his sisters who moved to Borneo (now part of Sabah).

Mijares went to high school in Baguio where he edited the school newspaper. Mijares pursued a Bachelor of Arts and Bachelor of Laws degree in the Lyceum of the Philippines University, and passed the Philippine Bar Examination in 1960.

Career 
Mijares became an editor for the Baguio Midland Courier in 1950 and the Manila Chronicle in 1951. He and Marcos formed a close relationship after Mijares covered Marcos in the Manila Chronicle. He would write articles aimed at convincing Filipino citizens that martial law was needed, notably a press release for Juan Ponce Enrile's alleged ambush before such an ambush was set to happen. Mijares was later selected by Marcos as the presidential reporter for the Philippines Daily Express following its reopening after martial law was declared.

When Marcos established the Media Advisory Council in 1973, its ex-officio position of chairman was to be filled by the president of the National Press Club. He later told Mijares to run for the position, which he later won as he had no opponents.

Defection and disappearance 
Midway through the martial law period, Mijares became disgusted with the Marcos regime. In an interview with the Reno Gazette-Journal, he stated that he "felt guilty allowing all Marcos' friends to take over for nothing."

On October 23, 1974, Mijares fled the Philippines for the United States. He then issued a defection statement in the United States on February 5, 1975, and began living in San Francisco, California.

On June 17, 1975, Mijares was to appear before a United States House International Relations subcommittee to testify claims of bribery, corruption, and fraud against Marcos. The night prior, Marcos made an international telephone call to Mijares, asking him not to testify. Guillermo de Vega then got on the line and offered Mijares US$50,000 as a bribe. The following day, then-Philippine Consul General Trinidad Alconel called Mijares to reiterate the bribe, which was raised to US$100,000. Mijares rejected the bribes and continued with his testimony as planned. Then-Information Secretary Francisco Tatad later said that Marcos denied ever making a telephone call to Mijares.

After his testimony, Mijares began writing a book entitled The Conjugal Dictatorship of Ferdinand and Imelda Marcos, which was published in 1976. The book contained a personal account of the Marcos regime.

Mijares made his final phone call to his family on January 23, 1977. Mijares was last seen in January 1977, boarding a flight from Guam to the Philippines with General Fabian Ver and a nephew of Querube Makalintal. Later attempts at finding him failed as there were no more traces of Mijares found. Urban legends claim that Mijares was forced off of a flying chopper midway through Guam and the Philippines, although his family has denied such claim.

Personal life and legacy 
 
Mijares was married in the Philippines to the future Pasay City RTC Branch 108 Judge Priscilla De Villa Castillo on February 23, 1956 in Manila. Priscilla Mijares called it the best day of her life, and they had four children. Months after Mijares' disappearance, their youngest son, Luis Manuel "Boyet" Mijares, was kidnapped, brutally tortured, and killed. The Mijares home was wiretapped, and the police called Boyet to tell him to meet his father. He was later found in an open field with his body completely mutilated. During this time, the assigned police officer, future presidential candidate Panfilo Lacson lied to Priscilla that her son was just joining a fraternity at the University of the Philippines. Mijares was also illegally married to Virginia Concha on September 6, 1969, in Reno, Nevada. The term conjugal dictatorship is generally used in pop culture and academic circles whenever there is mention of the Imelda and Ferdinand Marcos dictatorship, due to the first tell-all book of Marcos, which was Mijares's only book before his disappearance and act of valiant heroism.

Raissa Robles, an author and writer paid tribute to his son Boyet in the very introduction of her book Marcos Martial Law: Never Again. Former Philippines senator Rene Saguisag has mentioned that of all the heroes featured at the Bantayog ng mga Bayani, Mijares is the one who deserved to be there the most, and was shocked that his name was yet to be engraved. This was after the museum hosted a symposium on his life and his book The Conjugal Dictatorship, considered the definitive book and account of Martial law.

In popular culture
Primitivo Mijares and his son Boyet were featured in a nine minute song called, "Primitivo Mijares Requiem" which was sung by Jose Paulo Dela Cruz and produced by Francis Tanseco, a painter in the United States whose works have been featured at the London embassy.

Works 
Mijares only published one book: The Conjugal Dictatorship of Ferdinand and Imelda Marcos (1976), an exposé on the presidency of Ferdinand Marcos. The annotated version of the book was relaunched in 2017 by Mijares's grandson, JC Mijares Gurango, along with the Bantayog ng mga Bayani and Ateneo de Manila University Press. It was relaunched on February 21, right before the 31st anniversary of the People Power Revolution. After the People Power Revolution and again immediately after the 2022 Philippine general election, the book of The Conjugal Dictatorship was quickly sold out.

See also 

 Human rights abuses of the Marcos dictatorship
 Martial law under Ferdinand Marcos
 History of the Philippines (1965–1986)

References 

1931 births
Disappeared journalists
20th-century Filipino writers
Filipino expatriates in the United States
Writers from Batangas
Lyceum of the Philippines University alumni
Filipino journalists
Filipino activists
Tagalog people
People from Batangas
Marcos martial law victims
1977 deaths